The Siletz are a nearly extinct tribe of Native Americans from Oregon. Siletz may also refer to:

Confederated Tribes of Siletz Indians, a federally recognized tribal entity from the U.S. state of Oregon.
Siletz Reservation, an Indian reservation in Oregon, home to the Confederated Tribes of Siletz
Siletz Bay, a body of water in Oregon.
Siletz, Oregon, a city in Oregon.
Siletz River, a river in Oregon.
Siletz River Volcanics, a formation of Eocene volcanic deposits on the Oregon coast.
Siletz terrane: Siletzia, a tectonic terrane that forms the geological basement under northwestern Oregon, southwestern Washington (state), and the southern tip of Vancouver Island.